Robbery Under Law (1939) is a polemic travel book by the British writer Evelyn Waugh. It depicts the Leftist nationalization of the petroleum industry, and the persecution of Catholics in Mexico, under Lázaro Cárdenas, in 1938.  Waugh's trip to Mexico was financed by the Cowdray Estate, which held extensive interests in Mexican oil and had suffered heavy losses due to the nationalization.

There is another book of the same name by the author John Armstrong Chaloner.

Critical reception
In contrast to Graham Greene's The Lawless Roads, this work of 1930s travel writing found little favor in its time. One critic called it "polemical in content, rancorous in tone — by much the dreariest of [Waugh's] travel books". However, at least one critic takes the opposite stance, calling it "[The English] language's greatest single traditionalist credo."

Notes

References
Waugh, Evelyn. Robbery Under Law: The Mexican Object-Lesson, Chapman and Hall, 1939. Blue cloth hardcover. The Akadine Press, 1999. Blue paperback, A Common Reader Edition.

Books by Evelyn Waugh
1939 non-fiction books
British travel books
Books about Mexico
Chapman & Hall books
English non-fiction books